This is a list of Lithuanian language writers.
Mikalojus Akelaitis (1829–1887)
Antanas Baranauskas (1835–1902)
Bernardas Brazdžionis (1907–2002)
Teodoras Četrauskas (born 1944)
Mikalojus Daukša (after 1527–1613)
Kristijonas Donelaitis (1714–1780)
Romualdas Granauskas (born 1939)
Juozas Grušas (1901–1986)
Vincas Krėvė-Mickevičius (1882–1954)
Vytautas Mačernis (1921–1944)
Maironis (1862–1932)
Justinas Marcinkevičius (1930–2011)
Martynas Mažvydas (1510–1563)
Vincas Mykolaitis-Putinas (1893–1967)
Salomėja Nėris (1904–1945)
Henrikas Radauskas (1910–1970)
Liudvikas Rėza (1776–1840)
Rapolas Šaltenis (1908–2007), journalist, author, translator, and teacher
Antanas Škėma (1910–1961)
Balys Sruoga (1896–1947)
Indrė Valantinaitė (born 1984), poet
Vydūnas (1868–1953)
Žemaitė (1845–1921)

References

External links

LITHUANIAN WRITERS
List of important Lithuanian writers in Lithuanian.

Authors
Lithuanian writers
Lithuanian authors